Genius + Soul = Jazz is a 1961 album by American musician Ray Charles, featuring big band arrangements by Quincy Jones and Ralph Burns. Charles is accompanied by two groups drawn from members of The Count Basie Band and from the ranks of top New York session players. It was recorded at Van Gelder Studio in two sessions on December 26 and 27, 1960 and originally released on the Impulse! label as Impulse! A–2.

Genius + Soul = Jazz was re-issued in the UK, first in 1989 on the Castle Communications "Essential Records" label, and by Rhino Records in 1997 on a single CD together with Charles' 1970 My Kind of Jazz. In 2010, Concord Records released a deluxe edition comprising digitally remastered versions of Genius + Soul = Jazz, My Kind of Jazz, Jazz Number II, and My Kind of Jazz Part 3.

In 2000, the album was voted number 360 in Colin Larkin's All Time Top 1000 Albums 3rd Edition.
It was inducted into the Grammy Hall of Fame in 2011.

Critical reception

In the Encyclopedia of Albums, edited by Paul Du Noyer, the album is described as "The eclectic Charles's only big-band jazzy get-together of the early Sixties"; the track "One Mint Julep" is highlighted as "[seeing] the versatile singer cool and confident enough to let the musicians do the talking, while he played the organ throughout. Yet his mixing together of various styles was vastly influential, and his legacy to singers was what Chuck Berry's was to guitarists." In 2000, Genius + Soul = Jazz was voted number 360 in Colin Larkin's All Time Top 1000 Albums 3rd Edition.

In 2011, the album was inducted into the Grammy Hall of Fame.

Track listing
 "From the Heart" (Ray Charles) arr. Quincy Jones – 3:30
 "I've Got News for You" (Roy Alfred) arr. Ralph Burns – 4:28
 "Moanin'" (Bobby Timmons) arr. Quincy Jones – 3:14
 "Let's Go" (Ray Charles) arr. Ralph Burns – 2:39
 "One Mint Julep" (Rudy Toombs) arr. Quincy Jones – 3:02
 "I'm Gonna Move to the Outskirts of Town" (Andy Razaf, Casey Bill Weldon) arr. Quincy Jones – 3:38
 "Stompin' Room Only" (Howard Marks) arr. Ralph Burns – 3:35
 "Mister C" (Ray Charles) arr. Ralph Burns – 4:28
 "Strike Up the Band" (George Gershwin, Ira Gershwin) arr. Quincy Jones – 2:35
 "Birth of the Blues" (Ray Henderson, Buddy G. DeSylva, Lew Brown) arr. Ralph Burns – 5:05

Personnel

On all tracks
Ray Charles – vocals, piano, keyboards

December 26, 1960, session: Tracks 1, 2, 3, 7, 8 & 9
Clark Terry, Phillip Guilbeau, Thad Jones, Joe Newman, Snooky Young – trumpets
Urbie Green, Henry Coker, Al Grey, Benny Powell – trombones
Marshal Royal, Frank Wess – alto saxophones
Frank Foster, Billy Mitchell – tenor saxophones
Charlie Fowlkes – baritone saxophone
Freddie Green – guitar
Eddie Jones – bass
Sonny Payne – drums

December 27, 1960, session: Tracks 4, 5, 6 & 10
Clark Terry, Phillip Guilbeau, Jimmy Nottingham, Joe Wilder, John Frosk – trumpets
Jimmy Cleveland, Urbie Green, Keg Johnson, George Matthews – trombones
George Dorsey, Earle Warren – alto saxophones
Budd Johnson, Seldon Powell – tenor saxophones
Haywood Henry – baritone saxophone
Sam Herman – guitar
Joe Benjamin – bass
Roy Haynes – drums

References

External links
 Album summary

1961 albums
Ray Charles albums
Impulse! Records albums
Albums arranged by Quincy Jones
Albums arranged by Ralph Burns
Jazz albums by American artists
ABC Records albums
Rhino Records albums
Albums produced by Ray Charles
Albums recorded at Van Gelder Studio